This is an incomplete list of currently operating carsharing organizations.  Carsharing is model of car rental where people rent cars for short periods of time, often by the hour or minute.

Defunct services 
 Autolib'
 car2go
 City CarShare
 DriveNow
 Flexcar
 I-GO
 JustShareIt
 Maven
 PhillyCarShare
 ReachNow
 Streetcar
 Tilden Rent-a-Car
 Whizzgo

See also
 Sharing economy
 Alternatives to car use
 Car rental
 Carpool
 Fleet vehicle

References

Carsharing
Sustainable transport